Sugar Lips is an album by Al Hirt released in 1964 by RCA Victor.

The single, "Sugar Lips", reached No. 3 on the Easy Listening chart and No. 30 on the Billboard Hot 100 in 1964. The single, "Up Above My Head (I Hear Music in the Air)", hit No. 85 on the Billboard Hot 100. The album peaked at No. 9 on the Billboard Top LPs chart.

Track listing 
 "Sugar Lips" (Billy Sherrill, Buddy Killen)
 "The Girl from Ipanema" (Antônio Carlos Jobim, Vinicius de Moraes, Norman Gimbel)	
 "Tenderly" (Walter Gross, Jack Lawrence)
 "Up Above My Head (I Hear Music in the Air)" (Sister Rosetta Tharpe)
 "Milano" (Cy Coleman)
 "Back Home Again in Indiana" (Ballard MacDonald, James F. Hanley)
 "Pink Confetti" (Jerry Kennedy)
 "Poupee Brisee (Broken Doll)" (Eddie Vartan, Georges Aber)
 "September Song" (Kurt Weill, Maxwell Anderson)
 "New Orleans, My Home Town" (Beasley Smith, Teddy Bart)
 "Night Life" (Willie Nelson)
 "Looking For The Blues" (Billy Towne, Ritchie Adams)

Personnel
Al Hart - trumpet
Jerry R. Hubbard - guitar
Floyd Cramer - piano
Hargus Robbins - organ
The Anita Kerr Singers - chorus, arranged by Anita Kerr
Bob Moore, Boots Randolph, Buddy Harman, Dutch McMillin, Grady Martin, Ray Edenton - unspecified instruments
Technical
Chuck Seitz - recording engineer

Chart positions

Singles

References

1964 albums
Al Hirt albums
Albums produced by Chet Atkins
RCA Records albums